Alpedrete is a town and municipality in central Spain. It is located in the Sierra de Guadarrama in the autonomous community of the Community of Madrid. It had a population of 13,391 inhabitants in 2011 (INE, 2011).

See also
 Los Negrales

References

External links 

 The official site of the city 

Municipalities in the Community of Madrid